Nupserha ceylonica is a species of beetle in the family Cerambycidae. It was described by James Clark Molesworth Gardner in 1936.

References

ceylonica
Beetles described in 1936